Danielle Wood (born 11 August 1972) is a Tasmanian journalist, writer and academic. Her first book, The Alphabet of Light and Dark, won The Australian/Vogel Literary Award in 2002.

Biography
Wood was born in Hobart, Tasmania. She was educated at The Friends' School in Hobart and went on to complete a Bachelor of Arts with honours from the University of Tasmania, before working as a cadet journalist. At age 26, Wood moved to Western Australia and enrolled in a PhD through Edith Cowan University, starting work on her book at the same time. She has since returned to Tasmania where she is a lecturer at University of Tasmania, Sandy Bay.

Books
The Alphabet of Light and Dark, Allen & Unwin, 2003, 
Rosie Little’s Cautionary Tales for Girls, Allen & Unwin, 2006, 
Housewife Superstar: the very best of Marjorie Bligh, Text Publishing, 2011, 
Marjorie Bligh’s HOME: Hints On Managing Everything, Text Publishing, 2012, 
Deep South: Stories from Tasmania, co-edited with Ralph Crane, Text Publishing, 2012, 
Mothers Grimm, Allen & Unwin, 2014, 
Island Story, Tasmania in Object and Text, Text Publishing, 2018,

As Angelica Banks, with Heather Rose
Tuesday McGillycuddy series:
Finding Serendipity, Allen & Unwin, 2013, 
A Week Without Tuesday, Allen & Unwin, 2015, 
Blueberry Pancakes Forever, Allen & Unwin, 2016,

As Minnie Darke 

 Star-crossed, Penguin, 2019, 
 The Lost Love Song, Penguin, 2020,

Awards and nominations 
 1999: Famine Commemorative Literary Prize
 2002: Australian/Vogel Literary Award for The Alphabet of Light and Dark
 2004: Dobbie Literary Award for The Alphabet of Light and Dark
 2004: Best Young Novelist, Sydney Morning Herald
 2004: shortlisted for the Commonwealth Writers' Prize in the Best First Book category for the SE Asia and South Pacific Region for The Alphabet of Light and Dark
 2005: listed for IMPAC Dublin Literary Award for The Alphabet of Light and Dark
 2007: Best Young Novelist, Sydney Morning Herald
 2012: Alex Buzo Prize
 2019: Tasmanian Premier's Literary Prizes: Margaret Scott Prize People's Choice for Star-crossed

References

External links

1972 births
Living people
21st-century Australian novelists
Writers from Tasmania
University of Tasmania alumni
Academic staff of the University of Tasmania